Norma Shaw  (1937-2009), born near Wakefield, was an English international indoor and lawn bowler.

Bowls career

World Championship
Norma won twelve World Outdoor Bowls Championship medals. The success started with two gold medals and a bronze medal at the 1981 World Outdoor Bowls Championship in Toronto. Four years later she won a silver medal and another bronze at the 1985 World Outdoor Bowls Championship followed by two more silvers at the 1988 World Outdoor Bowls Championship. Norma then competed in her fourth and fifth successive championships at the 1992 World Outdoor Bowls Championship and 1996 World Outdoor Bowls Championship securing a bronze in both. Her final appearance was at the 2000 World Outdoor Bowls Championship in Moama where she won a bronze in the triples and finished with a gold medal in the team event.

Commonwealth Games
Norma represented England at four Commonwealth Games winning four medals from 1982 until 1998.

World Indoor Bowls Championship
Norma also won the 1997 World Indoor Bowls Championship held in Llanelli.

Atlantic Championships
Norma won five medals Atlantic Bowls Championships including a singles gold medal at the 1993 inaugural tournament in Florida.

National
Norma won eight National Championships bowling for Durham.

Norma was the first woman to break into the male dominated televised tournaments. She died in June 2009.

Recognition
Shaw was appointed Member of the Order of the British Empire in the 1985 Birthday Honours for services to bowls.

References

English female bowls players
1937 births
2009 deaths
Commonwealth Games bronze medallists for England
Bowls players at the 1982 Commonwealth Games
Bowls players at the 1990 Commonwealth Games
Bowls players at the 1994 Commonwealth Games
Bowls players at the 1998 Commonwealth Games
Commonwealth Games medallists in lawn bowls
Bowls World Champions
Indoor Bowls World Champions
Members of the Order of the British Empire
Medallists at the 1982 Commonwealth Games
Medallists at the 1994 Commonwealth Games
Medallists at the 1998 Commonwealth Games